Solemya parkinsonii is a species of saltwater clam, a marine bivalve mollusc in the family Solemyidae, the awning clams.

References
 Powell A W B, New Zealand Mollusca, William Collins Publishers Ltd, Auckland, New Zealand 1979

External links
 Notes on Solemya parkinsoni 

Solemyidae
Molluscs described in 1874